Lafayette Fountain is an 1887 fountain by sculptor Lorado Taft, in the grounds of the Tippecanoe County Courthouse in Lafayette, Indiana.  
The fountain is composed of a number of tiered bowls with a marble statue of the Marquis de LaFayette on top.  
He holds a sword next to his heart in his right hand and has a cape draped over his left arm.

History
Taft wrote about this early commission (perhaps his first) of his that: 

The fountain cost $2,200.

The Inscription reads:
(On eight panels on pedestal, raised letters:) 
 
(panel 1:) 
In HONOR OF GENERAL 
MARIE JEAN 
PAUL ROCH YVES 
GILBERT MOTIER 
DE LAFAYETTE 
BORN IN 
AUVERGNE 
FRANCE 
1757 
FOUGHT WITH 
WASHINGTON 
FOR AMERICAN 
INDEPENDENCE 
1776 TO 1782 
DIED 1834  

(panel 2:)  
ARTESIAN 
WELL 
CONSTRUCTED BY 
TIPPECANOE 
COUNTY 
COMMENCED 
APRIL 22, 1857 
COMPLETED 
FEBRUARY 18, 1858 
DEPTH 230 FEET.  

(panel 3:)  
IN MEMORY OF 
JOHN 
PURDUE 
WHOSE 
MUNIFICENCE 
GAVE 
NAME TO 
PURDUE 
UNIVERSITY 
BORN 1801 
DIED 1876.  

(panel 4:)  
IN HONOR OF 
THE 
EARLY 
PIONEERS 
OF THE 
COUNTY 
AND 
CITY.  

(panel 5:)  
TIPPECANOE 
COUNTY 
COURTHOUSES 
FIRST 
ERECTED 1829 
SECOND 
ERECTED 
1845. 
THIRD 
ERECTED 1881.  

(panel 6:)  
IN MEMORY OF 
THE 
GALLANT 
SOLDIERS 
OF 
TIPPECANOE 
COUNTY 
WHO FOUGHT 
FOR THE UNION.  

(panel 7:)  
IN MEMORY OF WILLIAM 
DIGBY 
FOUNDER OF THE 
CITY OF 
LAFAYETTE 
MAY 27, 1825. 
BORN 1802 
DIED 1864.  

(panel 8:)  
ERECTED BY 
THE 
CITY OF 
LAFAYETTE 
1887.

Water for the fountain was originally supplied by a 230-foot well beneath it, which was  installed in 1857 and whose waters were believed to have curative properties.  The well was capped in 1936, and the fountain's water now comes from elsewhere.

Sources

Fountains in Indiana
Monuments and memorials in Indiana
Sculptures by Lorado Taft
1887 sculptures
Marble sculptures in Indiana
Cultural depictions of Gilbert du Motier, Marquis de Lafayette
1887 establishments in Indiana